Moomba (also known as the Moomba Festival) is held annually in Melbourne, Australia. Run by the City of Melbourne, it is Australia's largest free community festival. The Melburnian tradition is celebrated over four days, incorporating the Labour Day long weekend, from Friday to the second Monday in March. Moomba is culturally important to Melbourne, having been celebrated since 1955, and regularly attracts up to a million people, with a record attendance of 3.8 million (2.3 million tourists) set in 2018.

In 2003, the event was renamed Melbourne Moomba Waterfest. 

Traditional events include the Moomba parade, crowning of Moomba monarchs, fireworks displays, carnivals in the gardens along the river, river activities including watersports, water floats and the Birdman Rally, as well as live music and bands.

In 2021, the usual Moomba was cancelled by Melbourne City Council, for the first time ever, due to events and issues related to the COVID-19 pandemic in Australia. However "Moomba 2.0" events were held on 5–8 March.

Origins
In 1951, Australia celebrated fifty years of Federation with a parade and the staging of the theatre production An Aboriginal Moomba: Out of the Dark. In 1954, Queen Elizabeth II visited the city for the first time as reigning monarch, and the City Development Association and the Melbourne City Council proposed an autumn carnival to be known as "Moomba". A committee was formed in July, 1954 to organise and fund the event, successfully allocating £10,000 to its inaugural running. Before the event's first year, controversy was created when Labor Councillor Frank Williams resigned from the committee, branding the planned carnival as a "Bourke street joke for the benefit of shopkeepers". A promotional theme song "Come to Melbourne for the Moomba" was written by Jack O'Hagan.

Etymology
The festival was originally named Moomba by organisers in the belief it was a native word meaning 'let's get together and have fun.' Credit is usually given to Bill Onus, a unionist and member of the Australian Aborigines' League for proposing the term, which he used in a play, Aboriginal Moomba in 1951. In 1969 Luise Hercus glossed the word mum (rhyming with 'vroom') as meaning 'bottom, rump', and suggested mum-ba meant something like 'bottom and..', and had been introduced from Healesville usage as a joke. In 1981 Barry Blake analysed the word as combining as mum (anus) and –ba, a locative suffix meaning 'at, in, on'. This would give the sense of 'up your bum/arse'.

Onus himself, according to his daughter-in-law, who said she had heard the story from Onus's wife Mary, had picked up the word from a word list of indigenous terms. Some say he did it to get back at the city council for having deliberately upstaged the traditional Labour Day march with a popular carnival. Lin Onus, his son, stated that indeed his father had intended to play a prank in passing on the word with this sense.

Event history

The first Moomba was a 15-day festival officially opened on 12 March 1955 by the State Governor, Sir Dallas Brooks. The inaugural programme included a fireworks display, parade, vintage car display, Henley rowing regatta, river floats including a "Lord Mayor's houseboat", cycling race, tennis at Kooyong, concerts including performances by the Victorian Symphony Orchestra and Royal Philharmonic choir, crowning of the Queen of Moomba and riverside carnival. 25,000 turned out to watch the inaugural Moomba parade down Swanston Street. The first Moomba was heavily criticised by Melbourne's conservative establishment, including the Anglican Church, which at the time claimed it was hedonistic and embodying social decay. Council responded to the criticism citing that Moomba was intended to be a festival for families and as such is reinforcing family values in society.

One of the popular events associated with Moomba was the Herald Sun Outdoor Art Show in the Treasury Gardens.

After the 2016 Moomba festival fireworks there was a large-scale brawl in and around Federation Square in Melbourne's Central Business District, largely between members of two gangs, Apex and Islander 23.

2021 – Moomba 2.0 
In 2021 the usual Moomba events were cancelled by Melbourne City Council, for the first time ever, due to COVID-19 restrictions and Victoria's third lockdown in February. The Moomba Parade and the Birdman Rally were already cancelled.

Instead of the normal festival attractions, Lord Mayor Sally Capp said Moomba 2.0 will be: "... a series of fun, family friendly events and attractions across the city that will help bring the buzz back to Melbourne." There will be ticketing and COVID-safe marshals across all sites. Moomba 2.0 will be a COVID-safe event.

Events

Parade and floats
A parade (or "procession") and floats through the streets of Melbourne have been a key part of the Moomba festival since its beginning. Each year it attracts over 100,000 people to Melbourne's city centre as well as being shown on free-to-air television in Melbourne.

The first Moomba procession was held in 1955. It was first televised in 1957, the year after the Melbourne 1956 Olympics.

The floats have an annual theme, usually an elaboration on "Let's get together and have fun", the avowed mission and vision statement of Moomba and are usually from sister cities (of which Melbourne has six), schools and community groups. They also promote some aspect of the arts, like singing, dancing, or design. Swanston Street is the traditional home of the floats and spine of the city and horse- or tractor-drawn floats use the tram tracks. Decorated trams are sometimes also featured.

In 2001, the parade came under media controversy when a French Troupe and Melbourne's Snuff Puppets had floats with naked people covered in body paint.

Moomba monarchs

The Moomba monarchy has been one of the most celebrated and controversial components of the festival over the years.

In 1999 the tradition ended when clowns Zig and Zag were appointed. After it was revealed that, years before, Zig (Jack Perry) had pleaded guilty to child molestation, they were dethroned. In 2010 the tradition was finally restored after 11 years with Molly Meldrum and Kate Ceberano being named King and Queen of Moomba.

Queen of Moomba (1955 to 1987) from Beverley Stewart to Marita Jones. Won by a beauty pageant competition. 1966 Moomba Queen Erica McMillan was killed in a car accident seven weeks after the festival, in the car which she had received as a prize for being voted Queen.

Queen of the Pacific (1967–1977) from Betty Lim Saw Yim (as Princess of Malaysia) to Lei Maa (Princess of Hawaii).

King of Moomba (1967 to 1987): British actor Robert Morley (1967), British actor Alfred Marks (1968), Italian opera singer Tito Gobbi (1969), featherweight boxing champion Johnny Famechon (1970), Russian clown Oleg Popov (1971), pop singer Johnny Farnham (1972) with Collingwood footballer Lou Richards as his Jester, indigenous Pastor Sir Douglas Nicholls (1973), ballet dancer Sir Robert Helpmann (1974), entertainer Rolf Harris (1975), entertainer Barry Crocker (1976), Disney character Mickey Mouse as King of Moomba and TV Personality Ugly Dave Gray as a Jester (1977), first Melbourne born king, entertainer Bert Newton (1978), entertainer Graham Kennedy (1979), TV actor Paul Cronin (1980), Lou Richards again but this time as King (1981), film, TV and stage actor Frank Thring (1982), TV Personality Daryl Somers (1983), footballer Kevin Bartlett (1984), TV Personality Ian "Molly" Meldrum (1985), motor racing driver Peter Brock (1986) and champion doubles tennis player Paul McNamee (1987). Another source lists Gobbi (1968), Marks (1969) and Richards as Jester (1971).

Young Ambassador (2003–2009): Carrie Stoney, Sam Quinn, Alan Wu, Natalie Bassingthwaighte and Trisha Broadbridge.

From approximately 19811988 there were also instances where Moomba included a Prince and Princess of Moomba designation consisting of two children chosen through a competition held by local radio station 3KZ.

Fireworks
Fireworks are a big part of the Moomba festival and large displays occur on every night of the festival. The fireworks are above the Yarra river.

Carnival
A traditional carnival including a ferris wheel are held in the Alexandra Gardens along the river bank. In recent years, the carnival has extended to Birrarung Marr across the river. It is popular with children, and dagwood dogs and doughnut stands line the paths.

River activities
Moomba particularly celebrates the Yarra River, which has been much maligned during the history of the city until the last few decades.

Water skiing

Water skiing in the Yarra was introduced to Moomba in 1959. The tournament has both Junior and Open divisions, with the finals crowning the Moomba Masters Champions on Moomba Monday.

River floats

The festival has featured Chinese dragon boats and the Moomba Showboat.

Birdman rally
Among the more popular events is the Birdman Rally, begun in 1976, which is traditionally held at the Swan Street Bridge over the Yarra River. However it has been held only intermittently during Moomba's history. It was stopped for a number of years due to high levels of E. coli contamination of the Yarra. Subsequent clean-ups reduced pollution to acceptable levels and 2004 saw its return. In 2005 the rally was held in the new inner city park, Birrarung Marr, close to its traditional location.

Music and live bands

Moomba's performers have included international musical acts such as ABBA, Neil Diamond and AC/DC as well as a number of smaller local acts.

In 2012, performers included Tex Perkins and Daryl Braithwaite.

Citations

References

Other reading
Eckersley, M. 2012. 'Australian Indigenous Drama'. Tasman Press. Altona.

External links
Melbourne City Council's Moomba page
Social history of Moomba, on Culture Victoria
Snopes.com entry on the word "Moomba"
Also see the official Moomba history book written by Dr Craig Bellamy et al. (2006)

Festivals in Melbourne
1955 establishments in Australia
Music festivals established in 1955